Sergei Pavlovich Revyakin (born 2 April 1995) is a Russian football goalkeeper who plays for Alashkert in the Armenian Premier League.

Career

Club
On 26 June 2019, Ararat Yerevan announced the signing of Revyakin.

On 14 April 2021, Aktobe announced the signing of Revyakin.

On 26 September 2022, Alashkert announced the signing of free-agent Revyakin. After one appearance, Revyakin left Alashkert on 28 January 2023, resigning for Ararat Yerevan on 17 February 2023.

Career statistics

Club

Honours

Club
CSKA Moscow
Russian Premier League (1): 2013–14

References

External links
 
 

1995 births
People from Kronstadt
Living people
Russian footballers
Russia youth international footballers
Association football goalkeepers
PFC CSKA Moscow players
FC Armavir players
FC Ararat Moscow players
FC Ararat Yerevan players
FC Aktobe players
Russian Premier League players
Armenian Premier League players
Kazakhstan Premier League players
Russian expatriate footballers
Expatriate footballers in Armenia
Expatriate footballers in Kazakhstan